James Rodwell (born 23 August 1984) is an English professional rugby sevens player who was part of the national squad from 2008 to 2019. He ended his career with records as the Worlds most capped sevens player,  having played in the most consecutive tournaments (69) and most tournaments (93) in the World Rugby Sevens Series.

James is now Assistant coach for the Men’s and Women’s England Sevens teams.

Early life 
Rodwell was born in Wendover and began his education at Osmington School, Tring. He began playing rugby at the age of seven at Tring RFC, his local club. From the age of ten he played for Berkhamsted Collegiate School, figuring at centre and full-back.

Rodwell rapidly rose through representative squads, playing with Hertfordshire Schools 18 Group, London & South East U18, captaining North Midlands U20 and representing Midlands U20. During his time at Moseley Rugby Club in Birmingham, Rodwell was voted the U21 player of the year in 2004-05, the players’ player in 2006-07, and supporters’ player in 2008-09.

At Birmingham University Rodwell played mainly at Number 8 for the first team, developing into a key member of the leadership group of a club which valued on-field performance as well as social development.

In 2005 he was selected for English Universities, followed by England Counties (2006) and England Sevens (2008).

He completed his studies with a degree in Business Commerce.

Sevens 
Rodwell made his England sevens debut against the United States at Dubai in 2008.

James was named IRB player of the tournament in the 2010 Dubai leg of the series. He represented England in the 2010 Commonwealth Games in Delhi where the team finished fourth.
He also represented England in the 2014 Commonwealth Games in Glasgow where the team finished fifth. Rodwell also won the Mark of Excellency award in the 2019 London 7's which also marks his last tournament in front of his home fans.

Honours
 Silver Medal (Great Britain): Rugby sevens at the 2016 Summer Olympics
 National Trophy: 2009
 IRB player of the tournament Dubai 7s: 2010
 Wellington 7s: 2009 and 2013
 London 7s: 2009
 Dubai 7s: 2010 and 2011
 Tokyo 7s: 2015
 Cape Town 7s: 2016
 Vancouver 7s: 2017

References

External links
 
 
 
  (2010, 2014)
 
 
 

1984 births
Living people
English rugby union players
People from Wendover
Rugby sevens players at the 2010 Commonwealth Games
Alumni of the University of Birmingham
England international rugby sevens players
Rugby sevens players at the 2016 Summer Olympics
Olympic rugby sevens players of Great Britain
Great Britain national rugby sevens team players
Olympic silver medallists for Great Britain
Olympic medalists in rugby sevens
Medalists at the 2016 Summer Olympics
Male rugby sevens players
Commonwealth Games rugby sevens players of England
Rugby sevens players at the 2014 Commonwealth Games
Commonwealth Games medallists in rugby sevens
Commonwealth Games bronze medallists for England
Rugby sevens players at the 2018 Commonwealth Games
Rugby union players from Buckinghamshire
Medallists at the 2018 Commonwealth Games